Thunbergia erecta is a herbaceous perennial climbing plant species in the genus Thunbergia native to western Africa. Common names include bush clockvine, king's-mantle  and potato bush.

References

External links

erecta
Flora of Africa